Excelsior!, released in the United Kingdom as The Prince of Magicians, is a 1901 French short silent comedy film, directed by Georges Méliès. It is listed as numbers 357–358 in Star Film Company's catalogues.

Synopsis
A magician pulls a handkerchief from the mouth of his assistant. From the handkerchief, he pulls a large aquarium, and uses the arms of his assistant as a pump to fill it. The magician then pulls fish from his mouth to fill the tank.

References

External links 
 

Films directed by Georges Méliès
French silent short films
French black-and-white films
French comedy films
1901 comedy films
1901 films
Silent comedy films
1900s French films